Ilko Karacholov (born 25 February 1969) is a Bulgarian former luger. He competed at the 1992 Winter Olympics and the 1994 Winter Olympics.

References

External links
 

1969 births
Living people
Bulgarian male lugers
Olympic lugers of Bulgaria
Lugers at the 1992 Winter Olympics
Lugers at the 1994 Winter Olympics
People from Topolovgrad
Sportspeople from Haskovo Province